Dieuze is a commune in the Moselle department in Grand Est in north-eastern France.

People
Dieuze was the birthplace of:
Charles Hermite, mathematician
Edmond François Valentin About, novelist, publicist and journalist
Émile Friant, painter
Gustave Charpentier, composer
Count Karl Ludwig von Ficquelmont, Austrian statesman and general

See also
Communes of the Moselle department

References

External links

Official website 

Communes of Moselle (department)
Duchy of Lorraine